Our House: the Original Songs is a greatest hits album by a British Ska-Pop group Madness, released in 2002. It was released as a result of the stage show "Our House", and comprises the tracks which were included in the musical. The album features two new songs, "Simple Equation" and "Sarah's Song".

Track listing 
"House of Fun" 2:49
"Our House" 3:20 
"Simple Equation" 4:00 
"My Girl" 2:41 
"Baggy Trousers" 2:46 
"Prospects" 4:13 
"Embarrassment" 3:10 
"Driving in My Car" 3:18 
"Grey Day" 3:38 
"Shut Up" 3:26 
"The Return of the Los Palmas 7" 2:01 
"The Sun and the Rain" 3:30 
"Tomorrow's (Just Another Day)" 3:12 
"Night Boat to Cairo" 3:30 
"Wings of a Dove" 3:01 
"One Better Day" 4:06 
"The Rise & Fall" 3:15 
"Sarah's Song" 3:45 
"White Heat" 3:48 
"Michael Caine" 3:39 
"It Must Be Love" (2002 Mix) 3:25

Certifications and sales

References

External links

2002 greatest hits albums
Madness (band) compilation albums
V2 Records compilation albums